Scheidt may refer to the following:

People with the surname
 Edward Scheidt (born 1939), American cryptographer and ex-Chairman of the CIA Cryptographic Center
 Gottfried Scheidt (1593–1661), German Baroque composer and brother of Samuel Scheidt
 Hans-Wilhelm Scheidt (1907-1981), German Nazi official
 Mathias Scheidt, Archbishop of Vienna (1490–1493)
 Mike Scheidt, American metal vocalist
 Rafael Scheidt (born 1976), Brazilian footballer
 Robert Scheidt (born 1973), Brazilian sailor
 Samuel Scheidt (1587–1654), German Baroque composer and brother of Gottfried Scheidt
 Lords von Scheidt genannt Weschpfennig, a German noble family

Places
 Scheidt (Saarbrücken), a borough (Stadtteil) of the city of Saarbrücken, in western Germany
 Scheidt, Rhineland-Palatinate, a municipality in western Germany

See also